This is a complete episode list for the BBC television series Secret Army, which ran for three series from 7 September 1977 until 15 December 1979.

The series follows the members of a Belgian secret group 'Lifeline', dedicated to enabling Allied airmen to escape to Britain, usually after they had been shot down by the Luftwaffe. Following the timeline of the Second World War, the series shows its impact on the people of Belgium, but also features the attempts of the German Nazi occupiers of Belgium to capture the airmen and to expose and exact retribution on those helping them.

43 episodes of Secret Army were produced; however, the final episode "What Did You Do In The War, Daddy?" has never been broadcast.

List of series

A boxed set of all three series was released on 8 November 2004.

Series One: 1977
Series One was transmitted in 1977 and featured sixteen episodes. It begins in 1941 or 1942, when the Café Candide owner Albert Foiret and his mistress Monique Duchamps help Lisa Colbert (codenamed "Yvette") hide airmen and run the 'Lifeline' organisation.  The principal Germans in this series are Sturmbannführer Ludwig Kessler and Luftwaffe Major Erwin Brandt.  A British agent, Flight Lieutenant John Curtis is Lifeline's liaison with London.

Series Two: 1978
Series Two was broadcast in 1978 with various changes in the cast, including the death of Lisa in the first episode and the inclusion of pianist Max Brocard (Stephen Yardley). With financial support from London, Albert opened the larger Restaurant Candide, which was centrally located on the Grand-Place.

Series Three: 1979

References

Secret Army